is a subway station on the Toei Shinjuku Line in Chiyoda, Tokyo, Japan, operated by Tokyo Metropolitan Bureau of Transportation (Toei). Its station number is S-08. The station opened on December 21, 1978.

Lines

Platforms
Iwamotocho Station consists of two island platforms serving three tracks.

History
Iwamotocho Station opened on 21 December 1978.

Passenger statistics
In fiscal 2011, the station was used by an average of 40,324 passengers daily.

Surrounding area
The station is located 200 meters southeast of Akihabara near the Kanda River, underneath the intersection of National Route 4 (Shōwa-dōri) and Tokyo Metropolitan Route 302 (Yasukuni-dōri). The Shuto Expressway's No. 1 Ueno Line runs overhead. The area is mostly commercial, with some apartment buildings scattered throughout. 
Other points of interest include:
 Yamazaki Baking head office
 Higashi-Kanda textile wholesale district

Bus services
Stop: Iwamotochō-Ekimae
 Aki 26 for Kasai Station

See also
 List of railway stations in Japan

References

External links

 

Railway stations in Japan opened in 1978
Railway stations in Tokyo